The Yinnietharra rock dragon or Yinnietharra crevice-dragon (Ctenophorus yinnietharra) is a lizard in the family Agamidae. The species was first described by Glen Milton Storr in 1981. It is endemic to Western Australia.

References

Ctenophorus
Agamid lizards of Australia
Reptiles of Western Australia
Vulnerable fauna of Australia
Endemic fauna of Australia
Reptiles described in 1981
Taxa named by Glen Milton Storr
Taxonomy articles created by Polbot